Artemisia schmidtiana, common name silvermound, is a species of flowering plant in the family Asteraceae, native to Japan but widely cultivated as an ornamental.

Description
Artemisia schmidtiana is a small, mat-forming evergreen tufted perennial growing to 30 cm, with hairy silvery leaves and panicles of small yellow flower-heads; but like many artemisias it is cultivated for its foliage rather than its flowers.

The slightly smaller cultivar 'Nana' has gained the Royal Horticultural Society's Award of Garden Merit. It grows in USDA zone 1 to 9. It grows in full sun or partial shade in normal, sandy or clay soil. It is fragrant, has silver foliage and blooms in early summer. It attracts butterflies and is deer and rabbit resistant. It can be grown in garden beds as edging and borders, as a ground cover, in alpine and rock gardens and in containers. It is drought resistant and has a medium growth rate.

References

External links
Heritage Perennials, Artemisia schmidtiana ‘Nana’  Silver Mound Artemisia
Fine Gardening plant guide, Silvermound, Artemisia schmidtiana

schmidtiana
Flora of Japan
Plants described in 1872
Garden plants